Gatkuiyeh (also Romanized as Gatkū’īyeh, Gatkoo’eyeh, and Gatkūyeh; also known as Gankū’īyeh, Gatgūyeh and Katkū’īyeh) is a village in Vahdat Rural District, in the Central District of Zarand County, Kerman Province, Iran. At the 2006 census, its population was 127, in 29 families.

References 

Populated places in Zarand County